Yunchan Lim (born: March 20, 2004) is a pianist from Siheung, South Korea. In 2022 at 18 years old, Lim became the youngest person ever to win gold at the Van Cliburn International Piano Competition. 

In 2018, Lim won second prize and the Chopin Special Award in the Cleveland International Piano Competition for Young Artists. The same year, he was the youngest participant in the Thomas & Evon Cooper International Competition where he won third prize and the audience prize. In 2019, he became the youngest-ever winner of the Isang Yun Competition at 15 years old. In June 2022, Lim won gold at the Sixteenth Van Cliburn International Piano Competition in Fort Worth, Texas, making him the youngest-ever winner. Lim took two special awards, one for the audience prize and one for the best performance of a new work.  He additionally won US$100,000 and career management for three years.

Lim has performed with orchestras such as with the Korea Symphony, Suwon Philharmonic, Busan Philharmonic Orchestra, Fort Worth Symphony Orchestra, Cleveland Orchestra, and others.

Lim currently studies at the Korea National University of Arts under Minsoo Sohn.

References 

2004 births
Living people
South Korean classical pianists
21st-century classical pianists
21st-century South Korean musicians
Prize-winners of the Van Cliburn International Piano Competition
People from Siheung
Korea National University of Arts alumni